Ivar Afzelius (15 October 1848, Uppsala – 30 October 1921) was a Swedish jurist and politician.

Having studied law at the universities of Uppsala, Leipzig and Göttingen, he was appointed to teach process law at Uppsala in 1879. Bernhard Windscheid was one of his teachers. From 1891 to 1902, he was a justice in the Supreme Court of Sweden, 1898–1903 and 1905–1915 a member of the Riksdag, whose first chamber, the Senate, he presided in 1913–1915. Since 1905, he was a member of the Permanent Court of Arbitration in The Hague, and president of the Svea Court of Appeal in 1910–1918.

Afzelius is remembered as a precursor of a pan-Scandinavic legislative endeavour, especially the laws of the sea. He has been characterised as the prototype of an idealistic jurist in the liberal state. Still, he sought to link Swedish legal traditions to modern (especially German) dogmatic thought, whose reception in Sweden was strongly furthered by his authority.

He was made a member of the Royal Swedish Academy of Sciences in 1905, and of the Swedish Academy in 1907, on seat 4.

Afzelius was a member of the men's association Sällskapet Idun.

References

External links

1848 births
1921 deaths
Politicians from Uppsala
Swedish jurists
Academic staff of Uppsala University
Members of the Första kammaren
Justices of the Supreme Court of Sweden
Members of the Royal Swedish Academy of Sciences
Members of the Swedish Academy
Members of the Permanent Court of Arbitration
Speakers of Första kammaren
20th-century Swedish judges
19th-century Swedish judges
Swedish judges of international courts and tribunals